"Never Miss a Beat" is a song by British indie rock band Kaiser Chiefs, released as the lead single from the band's third album, Off with Their Heads, on 6 October 2008. The song was produced by Mark Ronson and features backing vocals from Lily Allen and members of rock group New Young Pony Club.

"Never Miss a Beat" premiered on BBC Radio 1's The Chris Moyles Show on 27 August 2008. On 17 September 2008, it was added to BBC Radio 1's A List. On 12 October, the song entered the UK Singles Chart at  5, giving the band their second UK top-five single as well as their fifth to enter the UK top 10. In the United States, the song was sent to modern rock radio in September 2008.

Music video
The music video was directed by Goodtimes and was released on 6 October 2008. The video shows the band performing in The Barge Pole Public House, based in Abbey Wood, South East London, with sporadic glimpses of people wearing masks occurring frequently throughout. These scenes were filmed around the Tavy Bridge area of Thamesmead, South East London. Ricky Wilson plays a weather man, and appears on a television next to the band.

Track listings

UK CD single
 "Never Miss a Beat"
 "Sooner or Later"

UK and US 7-inch single
 "Never Miss a Beat" – 3:07
 "How Do You Feel About That?" – 3:36

Australian CD single
 "Never Miss a Beat"
 "Sooner or Later"
 "Never Miss a Beat" (Yuksek Remix)
 "Never Miss a Beat" (RAC Remix)

Charts

Weekly charts

Year-end charts

Certifications

Release history

Usage in other media
The song was used on the official website for Formula One, as the background music for the video highlights of the 2008 Japanese Grand Prix. This song was used for the soundtrack in the games MLB 09: The Show, Tap Tap Revenge, and Pro Evolution Soccer 2010. It is playable in Guitar Hero 5, and was also in the film Diary of a Wimpy Kid.

Channel Ten used the song during advertisements promoting its 2009 Australian Football League coverage on its main channel, as well as its High Definition channel One HD.

References

2008 singles
2008 songs
B-Unique Records singles
Kaiser Chiefs songs
Lily Allen songs
Polydor Records singles
Song recordings produced by Mark Ronson
Songs written by Andrew White (musician)
Songs written by Ricky Wilson (British musician)
Songs written by Nick "Peanut" Baines
Songs written by Nick Hodgson
Songs written by Simon Rix
Universal Motown Records singles